Plug Sports (also known as The Plug Sports), is a Nigerian-based Sport management company owned by The Plug. The company operates as a division of The Plug Entertainment, and a subsidiary of The Plug. The sporting division of The Plug Entertainment, is headed by Lanre Vigo. Some of the soccer players managed by The Plug Sports include Henry Onyekuru, and Asisat Oshoala.

History
Plug Sports was founded in 2019 by Asa Asika, Bizzle Osikoya, and Lanre Vigo, under the entertainment company, The Plug. On 30 December 2019, Henry Onyekuru signed a management deal with Plug Sports in conjunction with Prokick UK Limited. On 31 December 2019, Onyekuru became Plug Sports ambassador. On 1 July 2020, Asisat Oshoala signed a management deal with Plug Sports. On 20 July 2020, Plug Sports director Lanre Vigo, announced partnership deal with K.S Management, a consultant agency.

On 29 July 2021, Plug Sports, launched Plug Sport Elite Under20 Champions, and a day tournament at Agege Stadium in Lagos, with the intention to discover the next football star, who's going to make the Under 20 Elite League in Europe; Say's Lanre Vigo. On 18 August 2022, Tobi Amusan signed a marketing and branding deal with Plug Sports.

Events Hosted
Asisat Oshoala Foundation Football (2020).
Plug Sport Elite Under20 Champions (2021)

Clients

Football/Soccer players
 Henry Onyekuru
 Asisat Oshoala
 Clement Ugah

Athlete
 Tobi Amusan

References 

Nigerian companies established in 2019
Sports management companies
Management organizations